Bharathiar Government Higher Secondary School is a Government Higher secondary school located at Veeravanallur in Tirunelveli district.

High schools and secondary schools in Tamil Nadu
Education in Tirunelveli district